Reynardine is a traditional English ballad (Roud 397). In the versions most commonly sung and recorded today, Reynardine is a werefox who attracts beautiful women so that he can take them away to his castle. What fate meets them there is usually left ambiguous.

The Mountains High 
The original English ballads upon which Reynardine are based, most of which date to the Victorian era, are generally found under the title The Mountains High. In the original story, Ranordine (also given as Rinordine, Rinor Dine, Ryner Dyne, Rine-a-dine, Rynadine, Retterdyne, Randal Rhin or Randal Rine) is a bandit or outlaw who encounters a young woman in the wilderness and seduces or abducts her. The song ends with a warning to young women to beware of strange men.

"The Mountains High" appears not to be very old, since only one version was collected before 1800. A version appears in George Petrie's 1855 collection of ballads; other variants appear in a number of broadside ballads from the nineteenth century. Washington Irving relates that the song had crossed the Atlantic and was being sung in Kentucky before 1832, and that it spread through North America in the nineteenth century as well.

A text of a circa 1814 broadside Ballads Catalogue: Harding B 25(1273) 
A new Song, called the
MOUTAINS [sic] HIGH.

ONE evening in my rambles two miles below Pimroy,
I met a farmer's daughter all on the mountains high,
Her beauty so enticed me, I could not pass her by,
So with my gun I'll guard her, all on the mountains high.→
 
I said my pretty creature I'm glad to meet you here,
On these lonesome mountains, your beauty shines so clear,
She said kind sir, be civil, my company forsake,
For it is my opinion I fear you are some rake.
 
Said he I am no rake, I'm brought up in Venus' train,
I'm seeking for concealment, all in the judge's name,
Oh! if my parents they did know your life they would destroy,
For keeping of my company, all on the mountains high.
 
I said my pretty creature don't let your parents know,
For if you do they'll ruin me and prove my overthrow,
This pretty little young thing she stood all in amaze,
With eyes as bright as Amber upon me she did gaze.
 
Her ruby lips and cherry cheeks, the lass of Firmadie,
She fainted in my arms there, all on the mountains high,
When I had kissed her once or twice, she came to herself again,
And said kind Sir be civil and tell to me your name.
 
Go down in yonder forest, my castle there you'll find,
Well wrote in ancient history, my name is Rynadine:
Come all you pretty fair maids, a warning take by me,
Be sure you quit night walking, and shun bad company,
For if you don't you are sure to rue until the day you die
Beware of meeting Rynadine all on the mountains high.
Wood, Printer, Liverpool.

A. L. Lloyd's contributions 
According to folklorist Stephen Winick, although the name "Reynardine" is found in one 19th century version, the association with foxes, as well as Reynardine's supernatural characteristics, first arise in connection with a fragment of the ballad (a single stanza) that was collected in 1904 by Herbert Hughes. The source's recollection of the ballad was that Reynardine was an Irish "faëry" who could turn into a fox. This ability (which is not suggested in any extant version of "The Mountains High") may have derived from the word "Reynardine": renard is French for "fox," deriving from the trickster figure Reynard.

Winick points out that Hughes and a friend named Joseph Campbell (not  to be confused with the mythologist) wrote short poems incorporating this stanza and the fox interpretation, aspects of which A. L. Lloyd in turn adapted for his versions of "Reynardine" (see Winick 2004). Winick also shows that Lloyd's versions incorporate several striking turns of phrase, including "sly, bold Reynardine" and "his teeth did brightly shine", that are found neither in the original ballads, nor in Hughes' or Campbell's versions.

Lloyd generally represented his versions of "Reynardine" as "authentic" folksongs (going so far as to claim to have collected the song from one "Tom Cook, of Eastbridge, Suffolk"), but this informant has never apparently been encountered by any other collector. Lloyd's claims have led to the current state of confusion; few modern singers know that the "werefox" interpretation of the ballad is not traditional. Lloyd's reworkings are certainly more interesting to the modern listener than the simple and moralistic original ballads, and have gained far greater interest from singers and songwriters; his versions of "Reynardine" have served as inspiration for many additional modern reworkings.

Modern recordings 

Modern versions of the song have been recorded for the following albums: 
1964: Folk Roots, New Routes by Shirley Collins and Davey Graham
1967: Fire & Fleet & Candlelight by Buffy Sainte-Marie
1969: Liege & Lief by Fairport Convention
1969: Prince Heathen by Martin Carthy and Dave Swarbrick
1971: Anne Briggs by Anne Briggs
1971: Rosemary Lane by Bert Jansch
1972: On the Mountains High by Margaret MacArthur
1976: Airs and Graces by June Tabor
1977: A Maid in Bedlam by John Renbourn
1977: Dark Ships in the Forest by Roberts and Barrand
1992: Weaving my Ancestors' Voices by Sheila Chandra
1993: Live in Concert by Green Fields of America
2001: Arthur the King by Maddy Prior
2003: Country Life by Show of Hands
2005: Milkwhite Sheets by Isobel Campbell
2008: Changing Trains by Mozaik
2008: Poor Man's Heaven by Seth Lakeman
2010: Genuine Negro Jig by  Carolina Chocolate Drops
2012: La Strega and the Cunning Man In the Smoke by Dylan Carlson (as Drcarlsonalbion)
2013: My Celtic Heart by Heather Dale
2015: Falling with a Thousand Stars and Other Wonders from the House Of Albion by Dylan Carlson (as Drcarlsonalbion) and Coleman Grey
2016: On the Lonesome Plain by Donal Clancy (son of Liam Clancy)
2017: Trails and Tribulations by Martin Simpson
2021: Fallow Ground by Spiers and Boden

See also
Reynard the Fox
the Gunnerkrigg Court character based on Reynardine and Reynard the Fox

References

Notes

Other sources
 
vWinick, Stephen D. "Resurrecting Reynardine: Authorship and Authenticity in the Afterlife of a British Broadside Ballad."A freely available reworked version of the Folklore article.

External links
 Fascimile of the c.1814 broadside of "The Mountains High" which is quoted above, at the Bodleian Library Broadside Ballads Project
 Fascimile of an undated 19th century broadside under the title "Reynardine" at the Bodleian Library Broadside Ballads Project. Compare to below.
 Reynardine Text of a version incorporating Lloyd's changes. (MIDI file of the tune can be played)
 Reynardine, a prominent character in the webcomic "Gunnerkrigg Court."
 MP3 of Reynardine performed by Daniel Dutton and Susan Alcorn
 Song version of Reynardine as recorded by Fairport Convention on their classic album Liege and Lief.
 Two paintings of Reynardine as a werefox may be seen at the webpage for Kentucky artist Daniel Dutton's "Ballads of the Barefoot Mind". 
 "Reynardine" by Andy Irvine (2006)
 

Ballads
English folk songs
Songs about foxes
Songs about werewolves
Songs about fictional male characters
Fairport Convention songs
English folklore
Year of song unknown
Reynard cycle